Nolan Richardson Jr. (born December 27, 1941) is a former American basketball head coach best known for his tenure at the University of Arkansas, where he won the 1994 NCAA Division I men's basketball tournament and led the Razorbacks to three Final Fours. Elected to the National Collegiate Basketball Hall of Fame in 2008 and the Naismith Memorial Basketball Hall of Fame in 2014, Richardson coached teams to winning a Division I Basketball National Championship, an NIT championship, and a Junior College National Championship, making him the only coach to win all three championships. During his 22 seasons of coaching in NCAA Division I, Richardson made a post-season tournament appearance 20 times.

Early life
Richardson was born in El Segundo Barrio in El Paso, Texas, United States to Nolan Richardson Sr. and Clareast Richardson. Clareast died from a mysterious disease in 1944, leaving behind three children: Shirley, age 5, Nolan Jr., age 3, and Helen, six months. Eventually they moved in with the children's grandmother, Rose Richardson or Ol' Mama. Ol' Mama had a profound impact on Nolan by helping instill the drive and determination to succeed. Nolan's father would visit, but often did not live with the family, battling alcoholism for much of his adult life.

Nolan Richardson played college basketball at Eastern Arizona Junior College during the 1959-1960 season.  He then returned home to play for Texas Western College (now the University of Texas at El Paso), playing his junior and senior years under Hall of Fame coach Don Haskins for the Miners.

Coaching career

Early years
Richardson began his coaching career at Bowie High School in El Paso, Texas. He coached at Bowie for ten years then moved to Western Texas Junior College for three seasons, posting a record there of 101-13. In 1979-80, his third and last season at Western Texas, he led the team to a 37-0 record and the 1980 National Junior College championship.

University of Tulsa
Richardson was the head coach at Tulsa from 1980 to 1985, leading Tulsa to the NIT championship in 1981.  This was the first time an African American coach won an NIT championship. Richardson is credited with bringing the Tulsa program to national prominence when hired in 1980, and led the school to season conference championships in 1984 and 1985 and conference tournament titles in 1982 and 1984 to go with the previously mentioned 1981 NIT championship. Richardson had a .763 winning percentage at Tulsa, and became the first coach in NCAA history to win 50 games in his first two seasons. While coaching at Tulsa, Richardson became known for wearing an assortment of polka dot ties. This trademark eventually led Tulsa students to don polka dots during home games.

University of Arkansas
In 1985, Richardson became the head coach at the University of Arkansas after Eddie Sutton left for Kentucky.  Richardson became the first African-American coach at a major university in the South, and the first African-American head coach of a men's program in the Southwest Conference.  He inherited a team and program that was used to Sutton's halfcourt-oriented, walk-it-up-the-court style. Richardson's frenetic, up-tempo system was new to Arkansas, and many fans questioned his coaching style after finishing 12-16 his first season. However, by year two he had Arkansas back in the post-season with an NIT berth. By year three, he had Arkansas in the NCAA Tournament. The Hogs would make the tournament in 13 of the next 15 seasons. In all, Arkansas under Richardson enjoyed 15 post-season appearances during the 17 seasons of his tenure.

He led Arkansas to three Final Fours—losing to Duke in the semifinals in 1990, winning the National Championship in 1994 against Duke, and losing in the Championship game to UCLA in 1995. He was named the National Coach of the Year in 1994. Richardson's Arkansas teams averaged 27 wins per season during the 1990s, and they were the winningest team of the decade until 1997. The Razorbacks' 270 wins from 1990 to 1999 were more than all but four programs in the NCAA. Nolan's Arkansas teams won at least 20 games 12 times, as well as four 30-win seasons during his 17 years.

His teams typically played an up-tempo game with intense pressure defense - a style that was known as "40 Minutes of Hell."  In 2012, his coaching philosophy was featured in the documentary "40 Minutes of Hell" on ESPN as part of the network's SEC Storied series. Richardson is the winningest basketball coach in Arkansas history, compiling a 389-169 record in 17 seasons.  He is the only head coach to win a Junior College National Championship, the NIT Championship, and the NCAA Championship. Richardson is also among an elite group including Roy Williams, Denny Crum, Jim Boeheim, John Calipari and Tubby Smith as the only head coaches to win 365 games in 15 seasons or fewer.

University of Arkansas controversy
While at Arkansas, Richardson frequently spoke out about the negative stereotypes that he and other black coaches faced. His most controversial statement occurred in a post-game press conference in February 2002, when he spoke out against the athletic administration at the University of Arkansas. He claimed that he was being mistreated because of his race, and challenged Athletic Director Frank Broyles to ruffle feathers by declaring, "If they go ahead and pay me my money, they can take my job tomorrow."  Shortly thereafter, Arkansas dismissed Richardson as head coach. In December 2002, Richardson filed a lawsuit against the university, the Board of Trustees, and the Razorback Foundation, citing a racially discriminatory environment; the lawsuit was dismissed in July 2004.

Richardson's former long-time assistant, Mike Anderson, was hired as Arkansas' head coach in March 2011. Anderson led Arkansas to three NCAA Tournament appearances in eight seasons as head coach. Richardson attended numerous Arkansas home games during Anderson's tenure. On March 26, 2019, Anderson was terminated as head coach of the Arkansas Razorbacks after a lackluster 2018-19 season and was replaced by former Nevada head coach Eric Musselman.

Nolan Richardson Court
On March 28, 2019, two days after the termination of Nolan Richardson's protege Mike Anderson, the University of Arkansas Board of Trustees voted unanimously to name the court in Arkansas' Bud Walton Arena in honor of Nolan Richardson and his contributions to the University of Arkansas, state of Arkansas, and the United States of America. The honor became official in the wake of growing public support to honor Richardson in this way, including a resolution proposed during the 2019 regular session of the Arkansas General Assembly.

International
From 2005 to 2007, Richardson, (who speaks fluent Spanish) served as the head coach of the Panama national team. In March 2007, Richardson was named head coach of the Mexico national basketball team.

WNBA
In the middle of 2009, Richardson was named as head coach and general manager of a prospective WNBA expansion team in Tulsa.  While it seemed unusual to hire a coach before securing an actual berth in the league, the investors behind the expansion effort claimed this proved they were serious about wanting a team.  On October 20, 2009, the Tulsa group bought the Detroit Shock and moved it to Tulsa as the Tulsa Shock.  It was Richardson's first time as a professional head coach, as well as his first time coaching women.

Richardson's tenure with the Shock was far from successful.  His first season ended before it began when key players who had led the Shock to three WNBA titles opted, for various reasons, not to make the move to Tulsa. This forced Richardson to try to build the team around disgraced Olympic track star Marion Jones, who hadn't played a meaningful basketball game since her college days 13 years earlier. The players also found it difficult to adjust to Richardson's frenetic style. A lack of continuity plagued the team as well; all of the players who had come from Detroit had left the team by the middle of the season, and Richardson seemingly juggled the roster on a game-by-game basis.  The final result was a dreadful 6-28 record, last in the league. Richardson tried to rebuild the team by coaxing Sheryl Swoopes out of retirement, but after a 1-10 start, Richardson resigned on July 8, 2011.

Head coaching record

Junior College

College

 

†Richardson was replaced by interim coach Mike Anderson before the end of the season.

WNBA

|- 
| align="left" |Tulsa
| align="left" |
|34||6||28|||| 5th in Western |||||||||||
|- 
| align="left" |Tulsa
| align="left" |
|11||1||10|||| (resigned)  |||||||||||
|-class="sortbottom"
| align="left" |Career
| || 45||7||38||

See also
 List of NCAA Division I Men's Final Four appearances by coach

References

External links
 Arkansas Razorbacks bio

1941 births
Living people
African-American basketball coaches
African-American basketball players
American expatriate basketball people in Mexico
American expatriate basketball people in Panama
American men's basketball players
Arkansas Razorbacks men's basketball coaches
Basketball coaches from Texas
Basketball players from El Paso, Texas
College men's basketball head coaches in the United States
Forwards (basketball)
Junior college men's basketball coaches in the United States
Naismith Memorial Basketball Hall of Fame inductees
National Collegiate Basketball Hall of Fame inductees
Sportspeople from El Paso, Texas
Sportspeople from Tulsa, Oklahoma
Tulsa Golden Hurricane men's basketball coaches
Tulsa Shock head coaches
UTEP Miners men's basketball players
21st-century African-American people
20th-century African-American sportspeople
Women's National Basketball Association general managers